"Cry Baby" is a song by Japanese band Official Hige Dandism, released as a digital single on May 7, 2021. The song was used as the opening theme song to the first season of the anime adaptation of Tokyo Revengers.

Background and release

The full version of "Cry Baby" was first played on April 24, 2021 on the FM802 radio program . The song was later released digitally on May 7, 2021. It was used as the opening theme song to the anime adaptation of Tokyo Revengers, which was broadcast from April 11 to September 19, 2021.

To promote "Cry Baby", throughout July and August 2021, Official Hige Dandism performed the song on the music shows , the 2021 FNS Music Festival, and CDTV Live! Live!

Music video

A teaser for the music video was released on May 3, 2021.

Reception

In May 2021, "Cry Baby" reached 22,068 downloads. In September 2021, "Cry Baby" was certified Platinum by the Recording Industry Association of Japan.

In November 2021, "Cry Baby" reached No. 1 on the Billboard Japan Hot 100. It also reached No. 1 on the Billboard Japan Hot Animation for three consecutive weeks. In addition, it reached No. 1 on the karaoke charts, No. 2 on video views, No. 5 on the download charts, and No. 6 on the radio charts. In December 2021, "Cry Baby" had been streamed over 2 million times. Karaoke chain Joysound reported that "Cry Baby" was the second most requested anime song of 2021.

The music video for "Cry Baby" won Best Video of the Year and Best Group Video in the Japan category at the 2021 MTV Video Music Awards Japan.

Charts

Weekly charts

Year-end charts

Sales and certifications

Awards

Cover versions

The official YouTube channel for the anime adaptation of Tokyo Revengers released a video of Mikey's voice actor, Yū Hayashi, performing a cover of "Cry Baby" on October 11, 2021.

References

2021 singles
2021 songs
Anime songs
Japanese-language songs
Official Hige Dandism songs